Freyer is a surname. Notable people with the surname include:

 Achim Freyer  (born 1934), German stage director, set designer and painter
 August Freyer (1801–1883), Polish musician and composer
 Bill Freyer (1900–1961), Australian footballer for South Melbourne and Footscray
 Christian Friedrich Freyer (1794–1885), German entomologist
 Dermot Freyer (1883–1970), Irish author and activist
 Frank Freyer, United States Navy captain and 14th Naval Governor of Guam
 Hans Freyer (1887–1969), German sociologist
 Heinrich Freyer (1802–1866), Slovene botanist, zoologist, paleontologist and pharmacist
 John D. Freyer, American artist
 Martin Freyer (born 1995), Namibian cyclist
 Peter Freyer (1851–1921), Irish surgeon
 Sasha Waters Freyer (born 1968), American filmmaker
 Sigismund Freyer (1881–1944), German equestrian 
 Ted Freyer (1910–1984), Australian footballer for Essendon
 Timothy Edward Freyer (born 1963), American Roman Catholic prelate
 Tony Freyer, American lawyer

See also 
 Freyer's pug (Eupithecia intricata), moth of the family Geometridae.

Surnames